Al Capone (1899–1947) was an American gangster.

Al Capone may also refer to:
Al Capone (film), a 1959 biographical film
 "Al Capone" (song), a 1964 song by Prince Buster
 "Al Capone", a song by Michael Jackson from Bad 25
 Al Capone, a board game predecessor to Alhambra

See also
 Al Kapone, American rapper
 Al Capone II (1988–2020), a steeplechaser horse
 Dennis Alcapone, Jamaican reggae musician
 Capone (disambiguation)